Farnell is a surname, thought to originate from "Fern Hill". It is most common in the English county of Yorkshire. Notable people with the surname include:

 Anthony Farnell (born 1978), English boxer
 George Stanley Farnell (1861–95), classical scholar and educator, brother of Lewis Richard, below
 James Farnell (1825–1888), Australian politician
 Lewis Richard Farnell (1856–1934), Oxford classical scholar

See also
 Farnell, Angus, Scotland
 Farnell (cocktail), a drink first served in Park City, Utah
 Premier Farnell, British electronic component distributor
 J. K. Farnell, English manufacturing company best known for soft toys
 Farrell (disambiguation)
 Farwell (disambiguation)

References